The Lincoln Navigator is a full-size luxury SUV marketed and sold by the Lincoln brand of Ford Motor Company since the 1998 model year. Sold primarily in North America, the Navigator is the Lincoln counterpart of the Ford Expedition. It is the heaviest production Lincoln ever built, and is also the Lincoln with the greatest cargo capacity and the first non-limousine Lincoln to offer seating for more than six people.

Lincoln Navigator production was sourced from 1997 to 2009 at the Michigan Assembly Plant in Wayne, Michigan. Since 2009, production has also been sourced from the Kentucky Truck Plant in Louisville, Kentucky.

Background 
At the end of the 1980s, in the United States, sport-utility vehicles gradually began to transition from dedicated off-road vehicles towards dedicated family vehicles, similar to station wagons. In 1991, the Jeep Grand Wagoneer (SJ) ended its almost unchanged 28-year production run. The vehicle had gained a famous reputation for its high content, featuring the same content as a luxury sedan. A smaller, unibody Grand Cherokee (ZJ) was induced during 1992 that offered new luxury equipment and class-exclusive features. General Motors introduced the Oldsmobile Bravada in 1990 and Ford later introduced the Mercury Mountaineer in 1996, convincing several other manufacturers to introduce mid-size luxury SUVs. As full-size SUVs such as the Chevrolet Suburban and Ford Expedition are highly profitable vehicles, the Lincoln Navigator was positioned by Ford as a full-sized, luxury SUV.

First generation (1998–2002)

The Lincoln Navigator was launched on July 1, 1997 for the 1998 model year, with the first vehicle rolling off the assembly line on May 14, 1997.  Based directly on the Ford Expedition, introduced the year before, the Navigator gave the Lincoln-Mercury division its first full-size SUV (slotted above the Ford Explorer-based Mercury Mountaineer).

In its first calendar year of sales (i.e. 1998), Navigator contributed to an unprecedented event of recent decades – with Lincoln overtaking perennial rival Cadillac in annual sales volume. Initially, published figures indicated that Cadillac had outsold Lincoln by a scant 222 vehicles sold, thanks to an enormous surge in Cadillac Escalade sales in December 1998, from hundreds in previous months to almost 5,000. A subsequent audit resulted in a retraction/apology in May 1999, attributing the "error" to "overzealous" "low-level" employees.

Chassis 
The Lincoln Navigator was also developed under the Ford program code name UN173, with the Expedition developed under the UN93 program code name.  A full-size body-on-frame vehicle, the Navigator was mechanically related to the Ford Expedition; both vehicles were related to the 1997 Ford F-Series. The Navigator featured independent front suspension (short-long arm/SLA); the rear suspension was of a live rear axle design. Using an optional feature from its Ford counterpart, the Navigator was designed with load-leveling air suspension; tuned primarily for ride comfort, the air suspension lowered itself when the vehicle was parked.

Although technically available with rear-wheel drive, the primary drivetrain on the Lincoln Navigator was ControlTrac, a computer-controlled automatic four-wheel drive system. As with the Expedition, the Navigator was fitted with four-wheel anti-lock disc brakes.

During 1999, Lincoln would fit two different engines in the Navigator in an effort to better match full-size SUVs from General Motors. At the beginning of the model year, the Triton V8 was upgraded to 260 hp; as a running change during the model year, Lincoln would replace the SOHC Triton with a 300 hp DOHC 5.4L V8, named InTech (borrowing a name from the Mark VIII).

Body 
Although the Lincoln Navigator shares the same bodyshell as the Ford Expedition, giving it a similar exterior appearance, Lincoln stylists would make many design changes to differentiate the two vehicles.  Forward of the windshield, the Lincoln Navigator shares no body panels with its Ford counterpart, with its own front fascia (a grille design shared with the 1998 Lincoln Town Car and the 2000 Lincoln LS), wheels, roof rack, lower body trim, and taillights.  The interior of the two vehicles shared more commonality, with the dashboard common to both vehicles (with greater use of wood trim); the Navigator was given its own seat design.  To make for a quieter interior over the Expedition and Ford F-Series, the Navigator made greater use of sound deadening materials and higher-quality carpeting.

The Lincoln Navigator included standard features available or optional on the Expedition, including power driver and passenger bucket seats, 2nd-row bucket seats (with a 2nd-row bench seat as a delete option), floor consoles, and keyless entry.  The few options available included a power moonroof, a universal garage door opener, 7 seven to 8 eight passenger seating an electrochromic rearview mirror (filtering out headlight glare from vehicles seen in the mirror), and a premium audio system (a seven speaker, 290-Watt audio system with a 6-disc front console-mounted CD-changer, and rear seat audio controls), and 17-inch alloy wheels.

Some of the unique features on the first-generation Navigator were power-adjustable pedals (a first-of-its-kind feature on a luxury SUV), a feature on the factory radio that only illuminated the controls necessary for the selected function, full controls for the audio system, climate controls, and cruise controls on the front of the steering wheel, and rear seat radio and climate controls.

During its production run, Lincoln made few changes to the first-generation Navigator.  In 1999, alongside the addition of the InTech V8, power-adjustable brake and accelerator pedals were added; the previously optional 17-inch wheels became standard.

For 2000, the fender-mounted radio antenna was integrated into the right-rear window, while the interior received  Nudo leather seating surfaces. The carpeting and netting on the rear of the two front seats were replaced with leather and buttoned map pockets respectively, and the recessed tray on the rear center console's lid for those Navigators that had rear captain's chairs instead of bench seats was replaced with a flat leather lid. The options list expanded to include a satellite navigation system, heated and cooled front seats, a reverse-sensing system, and side-impact airbags.

For 2001, several minor cosmetic changes were made. On the hood's grille and tailgate, the Lincoln emblem was given a black background (replacing the previous red); on the tailgate, the Lincoln and Navigator badging switched sides. A VHS-based video entertainment system became an option. 

For 2002, heated and cooled front seats were available, and the outlined Lincoln emblem embossed on the center of the steering wheel was replaced with a molded Lincoln badge.

Second generation (2003–2006)

Launched in May 2002 for 2003, a number of changes and improvements were made to the Navigator thanks to a thorough redesign. The Navigator continued to share a platform with the Ford Expedition, which was also redesigned for 2003, but continued to differ from it in terms of styling and various upscale features. The redesign featured a thoroughly revised exterior, the first since the Navigator's launch, with only the front doors and roof panel unchanged from the previous generation. The new exterior came with things such as a larger chrome waterfall grille, brighter quad-beam headlights with larger housings, revised chrome door handles set in color-keyed bezels, and slightly wider running boards. Inside the Navigator was an all-new instrument panel and dashboard area which, significantly, was not shared with the Expedition. Inspired by the symmetrical, "dual-cockpit" layout of the 1961 Lincoln Continental, the instrument panel and dashboard area was adorned with real walnut burl wood inserts and panels and switches painted with a low-luster satin nickel color. Adding to the upscale interior design further were white LEDs, 120 in all, which provided backlighting for controls and switches. Additionally, to direct attention to the high-quality satin nickel-faced analog clock mounted in the dashboard, an articulating door is present to conceal the radio head unit and optional satellite navigation system when they are not in use.

Highlighting the Navigator's design changes were other new features and options for 2003. Newly available features like Ford's Safety Canopy side curtain airbags and a tire pressure monitoring system improved occupant safety. Convenience was enhanced by the availability of power running boards (an industry first), power-folding third row seats, a power liftgate, and HID headlights (for top end models). The available rear-seat video entertainment system was updated to be DVD-based and all Navigators now came with standard 18x7.5-inch alloy wheels with 18x8-inch chrome wheels available as an option.

Like the redesigned 2003 Expedition (U222), the Navigator benefited from a reworked chassis, new rack-and-pinion steering, and an all-new independent rear suspension (IRS), which brought better handling and ride comfort. The Navigator continued to benefit from a load-leveling air suspension but it now lowered the vehicle by an inch when stopped in the interest of easing entry and exit. The Navigator's powertrain was modified from the UN173, but the 5.4 L DOHC V8 used before was no longer advertised under the InTech name. In turn, towing capacity dropped slightly.

Tire-pressure monitoring was made standard for 2004 while Ford's AdvanceTrac, a type of traction control system, with Roll Stability Control was an option. In 2004, for 2005 the Navigator received a minor facelift with new square-shaped foglights replacing the circular ones used previously. AdvanceTrac with RSC was now standard while HID headlights were available on all models. In the interest of cost effectiveness, the 5.4 L DOHC V8 introduced in the 1999 model year was replaced by the same 5.4 L 3-valve SOHC V8 that had been available in the F-150 since the 2004 model year. The new engine was not marketed under the Triton name in the Navigator even though it is mechanically identical to the F-150's engine. The 4R75W 4-speed automatic transmission used from 2003 until 2004 was replaced with a new ZF-sourced 6-speed automatic transmission. For 2006, an Elite package for the Ultimate trim level was made available, including a DVD-based satellite navigation system with a voice-activated touch screen, THX audio system, rear-seat DVD entertainment system, and HID headlights.

Third generation (2007–2017)

The Navigator was redesigned under the U326 program code name, with new styling and mechanical features for 2007. Unveiled at the Chicago Auto Show in February 2006, the Navigator featured its most distinctive styling update since its introduction, with new front and rear fascias and side cladding. In front was a split upper and lower chrome grille with integrated fog lights resembling those of classic Lincolns like the 1946-1948 Continental, along with a more complex headlight design and a more prominent "power dome" hood. Elsewhere, an updated rear fascia featured taillights inspired by the Lincoln MKZ and chrome trim was more prominently used along the sides, including chrome lower body molding on the doors. The interior featured an updated dashboard and instrument panel with an extensive use of rectangular shapes, such as in the gauges, as well as greater use of real wood and satin nickel accents.

Accompanying the Navigator's redesign for 2007 was a new model, the Navigator L developed under the U418 program code name. Comparable to the Cadillac Escalade ESV, the Navigator L is  longer than the standard Navigator on a  longer wheelbase, increasing its cargo capacity. The Navigator L was introduced parallel to the Expedition EL, an extended version of the Ford Expedition. Both the Navigator and Expedition were redesigned for 2007 and based on Ford's T1 platform, which is related to the platform of the 2004+ F-150. Compared to the Navigator's previous platform, this platform provided greater rigidity for better driving dynamics. The independent rear suspension was replaced with a five-link IRS design to improve handling and ride quality. The Navigator continued to come with standard 18-inch alloy wheels, but both 20- and 22-inch wheels became available. The 5.4 L 3-valve SOHC V8 introduced in the 2005 Navigator remained unchanged for 2007. The ZF Friedrichshafen 6-speed automatic transmission was replaced by Ford's own 6-speed design, the 6R80 for the 2009 model year. In spite of this, thanks to an improved frame, the Navigator's towing capacity increased for 2007, approaching  in two-wheel drive models.

After the 2007 model redesign, the Navigator no longer used the same transfer case as the Expedition. Expedition four-wheel drives continued to use a two-speed dual range transfer case with off-road low range reduction gearing and default off-road program that remaps (reprograms) the electronic throttle control and traction control system response for off-road conditions. Navigator four-wheel drives were demoted to a light-duty one-speed single range transfer case which lacks low-range gearing.

For 2008, packaging for the Navigator's luxury and convenience features was simplified, resulting in the elimination of the Luxury and Ultimate trim levels and the standardization of a number of features that were previously optional. Some of these newly standard features included heated and cooled front seats, power-folding third row seats, a power liftgate, and a 600-watt 14-speaker THX II-Certified audio system. Also newly standard was a 3.31:1 rear axle ratio, though a 3.73:1 ratio was still available as option for the Navigator and remained standard in the Navigator L. Newly available was a rearview camera to aid in backing up.

For 2009, the Navigator's 5.4 L V8 gained  as well as flex-fuel capability. The rearview camera that was new for 2008 was now standard, as were heated second row seats, Front Park Assist, a capless fuel filler, rain-sensing windshield wipers, and Lincoln SYNC.

The third generation Navigator and Navigator L continued to be offered for the 2010 model year, with only slight changes.

For 2011, both the Navigator and the Navigator L featured HD Radio, Sirius TravelLink, and Lincoln SYNC as standard on all trims. The optional 20-inch chrome aluminum wheels offered from 2007-2010 were replaced with 20-inch polished aluminum wheels. 

For the 2013 model year, the only changes made to the Navigator were the addition of new color trims: Kodiak Brown Metallic Tri-Coat, Midnight Sapphire Metallic, and Ruby Red Metallic Tinted Clearcoat.

The 2014 model year was a carryover from 2013 with the same features and no cosmetic changes. This would be the last model year that it would feature the front grille fascias.

2015 refresh

In March 2013, Ford had confirmed reports that the next generation Lincoln Navigator would not be a repackaged Ford Expedition as the previous generations were, despite trailing the MKX in terms of sales but ahead of the MKT, but hopes to make it more competitive in the luxury SUV segment as they prepared to take on the Cadillac Escalade, Infiniti QX80, and the Mercedes-Benz GL-Class, each of which had already or would launch new generations in 2013 or 2014, and would be designed by the new Lincoln design team that also designed the new 2013 MKZ. It would be completely new and would feature the 3.5 Ecoboost, interior and exterior and performance upgrades. But in May 2013 a prototype Navigator with a different front grille was tested featuring the EcoBoost in preparation for the updated Navigator, which was followed by more spy shots taken in September 2013 that was sporting Lincoln's updated signature front grille.

On January 22, 2014, three photos of the 2015 Navigator were released on Twitter and Instagram, along with an announcement that the refreshed SUV would be revealed at the Washington Auto Show the following day (January 23, 2014). However, hours after the leaks were made public, Lincoln held a press event in Detroit for the vehicle and revealed the updated Navigator earlier than expected.

The 2015 Navigator and Navigator L kept the same exterior styling design as the Expedition instead of the reported repackaging that was announced earlier by Ford. However, it now featured an updated front grille with the rear tailgate lights bearing a resemblance to the Dodge Durango. The exterior included HID headlamps with LED running lights and full LED taillights. Twenty-inch wheels came standard, replacing the 18-inch wheels, while a reserve package featured 22-inch wheels. The dashboard panels features MyLincoln Touch with Sync as standard, controlled through an eight-inch touchscreen display in the dash, and home to twin 4.2-inch displays that flank a central speedometer, falling in line with the rest of the Lincoln models. The push-button start became standard, likewise a passive entry and a rear-view camera. Blind-spot monitoring was added as an optional feature.

Both the updated Navigator and Navigator L went into production in the summer of 2014, and arrived to dealers that fall as a 2015 model.

Safety

Fourth generation (2018–present) 

On April 12, 2017, the fourth-generation 2018 Lincoln Navigator was introduced at the 2017 New York Auto Show. As with previous generations, the fourth-generation remains the Lincoln counterpart of the Ford Expedition, offered in both a standard and long-wheelbase configuration (Lincoln Navigator L).  As before, both two and four-wheel drive versions are offered.

The fourth-generation marked a significant shift in the exterior styling of the Navigator, as it adopted styling features of the 2017 Lincoln Continental.  In another major shift, the model line adopted aluminum body construction.

Chassis 
The fourth-generation Lincoln Navigator uses the Ford T3 platform, developed under the U554 code name.  Retaining body-on-frame construction, the Lincoln Navigator (and Ford Expedition) were engineered alongside the 2015 Ford F-150.  The four-wheel independent suspension configuration was retained, with a redesigned rear suspension layout.

Shared with the Ford F-150 Raptor, the Lincoln Navigator is equipped with a 450 hp twin-turbocharged 3.5L EcoBoost V6 (although Lincoln has ended its use of the EcoBoost nomenclature).  The highest-output engine ever sold by Lincoln, the 3.5L V6 is paired with a 10-speed automatic transmission (replacing the previous 6-speed automatic).

Body 
Entering production with only minor differences from the Lincoln Navigator concept vehicle shown at the 2016 New York Auto Show (no inclusion of the gullwing doors and stair-style running boards, used largely for display purposes).  The 2018 Lincoln Navigator adopted several design features from the 2017 Lincoln Continental, including the style of its headlights, taillights, side vents, and its front fascia, with a large rectangular grille and a centered Lincoln star emblem.  While sharing its roofline and side doors with the Ford Expedition, in the style of Range Rovers, the B, C, and D-pillars are blacked out for a "floating roof" effect.

As with the 2015 Ford F-150, the body of fourth-generation Lincoln Navigator (and Ford Expedition) was designed as a part of a shift to aluminum body construction, with the use of steel largely reserved for the chassis frame rails.  Nearly  lighter than the previous generation, the fourth-generation Navigator is physically larger than its predecessor, with the standard-wheelbase configuration gaining three inches in wheelbase, while the long-wheelbase L gaining nearly an inch (becoming the longest-wheelbase Lincoln ever produced excluding the Mark LT pickup).  In terms of body length, both versions were shortened approximately half an inch.

Shared with the Lincoln Continental, the dashboard of the 2018 Lincoln Navigator replaced a conventional console (or column)-mounted shifter with dashboard-mounted buttons and paddle shifters. In the late 1950s, the Ford Motor company offered mechanical transmission gear selection featured on all 1957 and 1958 Mercury sedans called Multi-Drive which offered a similar approach.  For the first time in the model line, the fourth-generation Navigator offers a head-up display along with a 12-inch reconfigurable instrument cluster.

Trim 
The fourth-generation Lincoln Navigator continues the same trim line introduced in the 2015 model update, with Premiere (new to the Navigator for 2018) as the standard trim, Select as the mid-level trim, and Reserve as the highest trim level.

Alongside the revival of the Continental, the fourth-generation Navigator marked the debut of the Lincoln Black Label series.  A series of vehicles with interiors and exteriors coordinated around a theme (similar to the Designer Series Lincolns and Continentals of the 1970s and 1980s), the Navigator is sold with three Black Label themes: Chalet, Destination, and Yacht Club.

At a base price of approximately $95,000, the Black Label edition of the Lincoln Navigator is the most expensive vehicle ever sold by Ford Motor Company (with the exception of the Ford GT)

Future

Lincoln Navigator electric 
By May 2021, Lincoln had publicly released information that the company is working on an all-electric, battery-powered Lincoln Navigator. No date for bringing the SUV into production was given.

Awards
On January 14, 2018, The Lincoln Navigator was awarded Truck of the Year at the 2018 North American International Auto Show, marking the first time that a Lincoln vehicle has been given a NAIAS award, as well as the first American-built Luxury Sport Utility Vehicle in this segment to win in this category.

Sales

References

External links

Lincoln Navigator at AutoGuideWiki

Navigator
Flexible-fuel vehicles
Rear-wheel-drive vehicles
All-wheel-drive vehicles
Expanded length sport utility vehicles
Flagship vehicles
Full-size sport utility vehicles
Luxury sport utility vehicles
2000s cars
2010s cars
2020s cars
Cars introduced in 1997